Mitsushi Kuroda (born 13 October 1952) is a Japanese sailor. He competed in the 470 event at the 1976 Summer Olympics.

References

External links
 

1952 births
Living people
Japanese male sailors (sport)
Olympic sailors of Japan
Sailors at the 1976 Summer Olympics – 470
Place of birth missing (living people)